The Break is a 1957 novel by the French writer José Giovanni. It is based on a real escape attempt from the La Santé Prison in 1947. It was Giovanni's debut novel. An English translation by Robin Campbell was published in 1960.

Adaptation
The book was adapted by Jacques Becker into the film The Hole. The film starred Michel Constantin, Jean Keraudy (an ex-convict who performed as a character based on himself) and Philippe Leroy. It premiered on 18 March 1960.

References

1957 novels
French crime novels
French-language novels
French novels adapted into films
Novels set in prison
Works by José Giovanni